Gerhard Vosloo (born 10 May 1979) is a South African rugby union player. His position is Flanker and he currently plays for Toulon in the Top 14. He began his career with the Lions in his native South Africa before moving to Castres in 2006. He stayed for two seasons before moving to Brive. He was named in the best 15 of the Top 14 in 2009. He transferred to Clermont in 2011. On 17 March 2014, Vosloo signed for Toulon on a one-year contract, option for a further season from the 2014–2015 season.

References

External links

1979 births
Living people
South African rugby union players
Rugby union players from Pretoria
ASM Clermont Auvergne players
RC Toulonnais players
Rugby union flankers
Lions (United Rugby Championship) players
Golden Lions players
Pumas (Currie Cup) players
South African emigrants to France
South African expatriate rugby union players
Expatriate rugby union players in France